The Lykoi (commonly called wolf cat or werewolf cat) is a natural mutation from a domestic short-haired cat. The mutation has occurred in domestic cats over the last 20 years. DNA testing has been done by UC Davis to confirm that the cats do not carry the Sphynx/Devon Rex gene. The breed was developed by Patti Thomas in Vonore, Tennessee.

Lykos (λύκος, lýkos, pl. λύκοι, lýkoi, Ancient: λῠ́κος, lúkos, pl. λῠ́κοι, lúkoi) means "wolf" in Greek.

Characteristics 

Lykoi vary from completely covered in hair to partially hairless. Sometimes, they may lose all of their hair resulting in them looking like a Sphynx, but it grows back. Lykoi are genetically distinct from the Canadian Sphynx. The hair coat is unique in appearance in that it resembles the coat of an opossum when mostly coated. Standards call for a roan coat (of any colour, although black is most common), a wedge-shaped head, and a lithe body of solid weight without excessive bulk. Lykoi are said to be friendly and unchallenging in their behaviour. They display a high level of affection for their owners.

A unique characteristic of the cat breed is that the Lykoi sheds a lot when older, but regrows its hair later in life depending on the season.

The missing coat of the Lykoi's face gives the breed a wolf-like appearance.

History of the cat breed 
Two different sets of domestic short-hairs with the Lykoi gene were adopted from a rescue after being discovered in Virginia in 2010, by Patti Thomas, who co-founded and named the breed, and in 2011, a second pair were located in Tennessee, by Johnny Gobble.

In The International Cat Association (TICA) registry, the Lykoi went before the board in 2012 and was passed to "Registration Only" status by unanimous consent. The breed is now recognized as a Championship Breed and were able to begin competing against other Championship breeds from May 2017, with TICA. Work is currently being done to expand the breeding program.

In The Cat Fanciers' Association (CFA), Lykoi of all colours are accepted and competing in Provisional as of 2022.  They are expected to be accepted as a Championship Breed in 2023-2024.

The Lykoi is a naturally occurring gene in the feral cat population. The Lykoi breed was founded in 2011 by Johnny Gobble, Brittney Gobble, and Patti Thomas when two unrelated litters of kittens were presented to the founders as unique cats. The Gobbles did careful health evaluations to ensure that the cat's unusual appearance was not caused by sickness or disease. To prove that it was a gene, Johnny Gobble bred two of the unrelated cats to produce the first intentionally bred Lykoi. Since the mother to one litter was a black domestic, extensive outcrossing with short-haired black domestic cats began. With time, it was determined that the gene was recessive, and to continue to reduce genetic inbreeding, more outcrossing with the black domestic cats was done. There are still Lykoi cats born to the feral cat population, and sometimes they can be used in the breeding program. Once Championship status is reached, there should be enough outcrossing to ensure that inbreeding is minimal.

Coat 
At the University of Tennessee, dermatologists examined them for any skin abnormalities. Along with biopsy samples of the skin, the dermatologists could find no reason for the coat pattern. What they did find is that some hair follicles lacked all the necessary components required to create hair (which is why Lykoi lack an undercoat). They also found that the follicles that were able to produce hair lacked the proper balance of these components to maintain the hair (which is why Lykoi do molt and can become almost completely bald from time to time).  It was determined, with test breeding, to be true natural mutation.

References 

Cat breeds
Hairless cat breeds
Cat breeds originating in the United States
Rare cat breeds